Alfons och soldatpappan is a 2006 children's book by Gunilla Bergström.

Plot
Alfons is six years old. With his new friend Hamdi they often play war. Hamdi's father has participated in a real war. Alfons and Hamdi want to hear stories, but Hamdi's father doesn't want to tell much.

References

2006 children's books
Books about war
Rabén & Sjögren books
Works by Gunilla Bergström